Vikas Shridhar Sirpurkar (born 22 August 1946) is a retired judge of the Supreme Court of India. He was appointed Supreme Court judge on 12 January 2007 and retired on 21 August 2011, completing a four-and-a-half-year tenure.

Career
Sirpurkar became a Judge of Bombay High Court in 1992 and later transferred to the Madras High Court in December, 1997. He was elevated to Chief Justice of Uttarakhand High Court which he served from 25 July 2004 to 19 March 2005. He then assumed office of the Chief Justice of the Calcutta High Court from 20 March 2005 up to 11 January 2007. Finally he was appointed a Judge of the Supreme court of India on 12 January 2007 and retired on 21 August 2011, after reaching the retiring age of 65.
After retiring from the Supreme Court of India, he is expected to take office as the Chairman of the Competition Appellate Tribunal from July, 2012, following the retirement of Mr. Justice Arijit Pasayat from that position in May, 2012.

Notable judgements
His notable judgements include the confirmation of death sentence on Pakistani national Mohammed Arif alias Ashfaq in the 2000 Delhi Red Fort attack, part of a two judge bench with Justice T. S. Thakur. In December 2009, he reduced the death sentence to life imprisonment in a case of "honour killing" of a girl by her brother. In the hooch case in which he pulled up the Kerala government. He also ruled that the services provided by the office of Regional Provident Fund Commissioner would come under the ambit of "service" under the Consumer Protection Act of 1986 and that a PF scheme subscriber was a "consumer" under this act.

References

1946 births
Living people
Justices of the Supreme Court of India
Chief Justices of the Calcutta High Court
Judges of the Bombay High Court
Judges of the Madras High Court
Chief Justices of the Uttarakhand High Court
20th-century Indian judges